Thita glauca is a species of beetle in the family Cerambycidae. It was described by Per Olof Christopher Aurivillius in 1914. It is known from Borneo and Malaysia.

References

Pteropliini
Beetles described in 1914